Calbuco River (Río Calbuco) is a river running between Calbuco Volcano and Llanquihue Lake in the commune of Puerto Varas in Chile.

Rivers of Chile
Rivers of Los Lagos Region